Maw Shein Win is a Burmese American poet who lives and teaches in the San Francisco Bay Area. She served as the inaugural Poet laureate of El Cerrito, California from 2016 to 2018. Her works include Storage Unit for the Spirit House (Omnidawn, 2020), Invisible Gifts: New and Selected Poems (Manic D Press, 2018) and the chapbook Score and Bone (Nomadic Press, 2016). Along with Kathleen Munnelly, Win was also the cofounder of Comet Magazine. In 2017 she collaborated with artist Megan Wilson on the public art installation Flower Interruption for the Asian Art Museum in San Francisco. Win previously worked with Wilson on a broadside project entitled Broadside Attractions/Vanquished Terrains in 2012, and as an organizer for Capitalism is over! If you want it! She is a member of The Writers Grotto and is on the board of Oakland PEN.

Works
 Score and Bone Nomadic Press 2016 
 Invisible Gifts: Poems Manic D Press 2018 
 Storage Unit for the Spirit House 2020

See also 

 List of municipal poets laureate in California

References

External links 
 mawsheinwin.com

American people of Burmese descent
Municipal Poets Laureate in the United States
People from El Cerrito, California
American women poets
Year of birth missing (living people)
Living people